Isaac Promise (2 December 1987 – 2 October 2019) was a Nigerian footballer. He was the captain of the football team representing Nigeria which won the silver medal at the 2008 Summer Olympics in Beijing. He played professionally for 14 seasons, much of which was spent in Turkey. He scored a total of 77 club goals during his career.

Career

Club career
As a promising youngster, Promise went on trials with Nigerian second division side Grays International. Attracting attention from several big name football clubs in Europe, he went on trials with Manchester United alongside Mikel John Obi, but found the trials unsuccessful. After being linked with Dutch outfit Feyenoord Rotterdam he eventually signed for Süper Lig club Gençlerbirliği in a three-year deal in August 2005.

In the Turkcell Super League 2006-07 season, Promise scored 12 goals. He more than doubled the number of his total goals for Gençlerbirliği. On 15 July 2008, Promise agreed a 4-year deal with Trabzonspor.

With Trabzonspor, he scored two goals in 26 matches. Because of his average performance he was loaned out to Manisaspor for a year. Promise played 27 matches and scored six goals. In the summer of 2010, Manisaspor signed a contract with him. After scoring 11 goals in 30 matches with his now relegated club Manisaspor, he signed a 3-year contract with Antalyaspor.

In February 2015, he signed a six months deal with Balıkesirspor.

In August 2018, it was announced that Promise would join United Soccer League expansion side Austin Bold for the 2019 season.

International career
Promise was named as the captain of the Nigeria under-23 squad for the 2008 Summer Olympics, being held in China. On 13 August 2008 at Tianjin Olympic Center in Tianjin, Promise scored Nigeria's first goal against the United States in the group stage. Nigeria went ahead to win the match 2–1.

Nigeria ended up winning the silver medal after losing 1–0 to Argentina in the final.

Promise first appeared in the senior team in 2009. He earned 3 caps and scored one goal.

Death
Promise died of a heart attack on 2 October 2019, at age 31.

References

External links
 Nigerian Players Patabase
 

1987 births
2019 deaths
People from Zaria
Nigerian footballers
Footballers at the 2008 Summer Olympics
Olympic footballers of Nigeria
Olympic silver medalists for Nigeria
Pepsi Football Academy players
Olympic medalists in football
Medalists at the 2008 Summer Olympics
Nigeria international footballers
Nigeria under-20 international footballers
Süper Lig players
Gençlerbirliği S.K. footballers
Trabzonspor footballers
Balıkesirspor footballers
Manisaspor footballers
Al-Ahli Saudi FC players
Antalyaspor footballers
Kardemir Karabükspor footballers
Giresunspor footballers
Association football forwards
Saudi Professional League players
Georgia Revolution FC players
Austin Bold FC players
Nigerian expatriate footballers
Nigerian expatriate sportspeople in Turkey
Expatriate footballers in Turkey
Nigerian expatriate sportspeople in Saudi Arabia
Expatriate footballers in Saudi Arabia
Nigerian expatriate sportspeople in the United States
Expatriate soccer players in the United States